"Killshot" is a diss track by American rapper Eminem and produced by IllaDaProducer. The song is Eminem's response to Machine Gun Kelly's song "Rap Devil" that was released in 2018. Eminem had previously dissed MGK in his song "Not Alike" from his tenth studio album Kamikaze.

Background and release
In 2012, Machine Gun Kelly made a tweet about Eminem's daughter, Hailie Mathers (who was then sixteen). The tweet read, "ok so I just saw a picture of Eminem's daughter...and I have to say, she is hot as fuck, in the most respectful way possible cuz Em is king". MGK claimed to apologize to Eminem behind the scenes. After this, in 2015, Eminem allegedly banned him from going to Shade 45, a SiriusXM radio station owned by Eminem. In 2017, MGK was on Power 106 FM and did a freestyle with The LA Leakers. During this, he again claimed Eminem had banned him from Shade 45. MGK also collaborated on a song with Tech N9ne in March 2018, and sent disses towards Eminem. On August 31, 2018, Eminem released a surprise album Kamikaze in which he dissed several artists, including MGK.

On the song "Not Alike" from Kamikaze, Eminem made several disses aimed at MGK. Two days later, MGK responded to "Not Alike" with the song "Rap Devil", releasing a music video for the song as well on September 3, 2018. After MGK's response, Eminem released an interview with Sway Calloway, in which Eminem was asked about the feud. Eminem explained that he did not want to respond initially, because it would just benefit MGK's exposure. On September 14, 2018, Eminem released "Killshot". On September 19, 2018, the song was officially released as a single.

Critical reception
Vulture said "Eminem’s Machine Gun Kelly response is the best he’s sounded in half a decade".

Commercial performance
"Killshot" debuted at number three on the US Billboard Hot 100 in its first week after gaining over 38.1 million views within the first 24 hours of releasing on YouTube, making it the nineteenth most-viewed video in the first 24 hours, and the most for an audio only release on the YouTube platform. It also held the biggest YouTube debut for a hip hop video ever, surpassing Kanye West's and Lil Pump's "I Love It", beating the record just the week before. This was beaten by 6ix9ine's debut of "Gooba" in 2020.

As of October 2022, "Killshot" has been viewed on YouTube over 440 million times.

Response
Machine Gun Kelly responded in a tweet, criticizing Eminem for what he perceived as a slow response. Rapper Jay Electronica criticized Eminem for a line in the song where he jokingly accused Diddy of having Tupac killed. After this, Electronica had then deactivated his social media profiles. Rapper Iggy Azalea's name was dropped in the song and she let out a series of tweets reacting to and criticizing the lyrics, calling the bars "lazy". Halsey also responded to her name being dropped in reference to her relationship with rapper G-Eazy in a tweet saying, "I'm jus saying my pops had to hear a grown man talk about his daughter getting fucked while that man simultaneously defended his own daughter." She later added, "I'm not proud. I just don't care. They can argue about record sales. My album sold more copies than each of theirs." Her claim that her album Hopeless Fountain Kingdom allegedly sold more copies was later proven to be false.

Charts

Weekly charts

Year-end charts

Certifications

Release history

See also
List of notable diss tracks

References

2018 songs
Canadian Hot 100 number-one singles
Eminem songs
Songs written by Eminem
Diss tracks
2018 singles